Stephen N. Limbaugh may refer to:
 Stephen N. Limbaugh Jr. (born 1952), former Missouri Supreme Court Justice and current U.S. District Court Judge (2008–)
 Stephen N. Limbaugh Sr. (born 1927), former U.S. District Court Judge (1983–2008)